The 1965 Little All-America college football team is composed of college football players from small colleges and universities who were selected by the Associated Press (AP) as the best players at each position. For 1965, the AP selected two teams, each team having separate offensive and defensive platoons.

Senior Mel Stanton earned first-team honors after rushing for 1,238 yards, scoring 21 touchdowns, and leading Eastern Washington to its first conference championship since 1951.

Senior quarterback was described as "one of the most exciting quarterbacks of recent years", passing for 4,308 yard during his career at Texas A&I.

Junior linebacker Willie Lanier of Morgan State went on to play 11 years with the Kansas City Chiefs and was inducted into both the College and Pro Football Hall of Fames.

Defensive tackle Frank Cornish of Grambling was the largest player on the first team at 6 feet, 7 inches, and 285 pounds.

First team

Offense
 Quarterback - Randy Johnson (senior, 6'3", 194 pounds), Texas A&I
 Halfback - Mel Stanton (senior, 5'9", 185 pounds), Eastern Washington
 Halfback - Allen Smith (senior, 5'10", 190 pounds), Findlay
 Fullback - Randy Schultz (senior, 6'0", 202 pounds), State College of Iowa
 End - Tom Mitchell (senior, 6'3", 200 pounds), Bucknell
 End - Jerome Bell (senior, 6'2", 210 pounds), Central Oklahoma
 Tackle - Larry Cox (senior, 6'3", 250 pounds), Abilene Christian
 Tackle - Richard Rhodes (senior, 6'3", 230 pounds), Northeast Missouri
 Guard - Dan Summers (senior, 6'2", 218 pounds), Arkansas State
 Guard - Willie Young (senior, 6'2", 255 pounds), Grambling
 Center - Marvin Peterson (senior, 6'0", 195 pounds), Pacific Lutheran

Defense
 Defensive end - Tom Nelson (junior, 6'3", 220 pounds), Sul Ross
 Defensive end - Dave Lince (senior, 6'5", 236 pounds), North Dakota
 Defensive tackle - Robert Burles (senior, 6'4", 226 pounds), Willamette
 Defensive tackle - Frank Cornish (senior, 6'7", 285 pounds), Grambling
 Linebacker - Willie Lanier (junior, 6'1", 230 pounds), Morgan State
 Linebacker - John Huard, Maine
 Linebacker - Keith Atchley, Middle Tennessee
 Defensive back - Pat Whalin, Saint John's (Minnesota)
 Defensive back - Tim Chilcutt, Austin Peay
 Defensive back - John Perry, Tampa
 Defensive back - Barry Roach, East Stroudsburg

Second team

Offense
 Quarterback - Ray Jones, Los Angeles State
 Halfback - Ken Rota, ND State
 Halfback - David Flet, Northern Michigan
 Fullback - Dave Alexander, East Carolina
 End - Richard Koite, Wagner
 End - Milton Morin, Massachusetts
 Tackle - Fred Cremer, Saint John's (Minnesota)
 Tackle - Leonard Tyler, Ithaca
 Guard - Harlan Aden, Omaha
 Guard - Robert Ferguson, Linfield
 Center - Al DePalma, Montclair State

Defense
 Defensive end - Tom Davis, Tennessee State
 Defensive end - Bill Scott, Northeast Oklahoma
 Defensive tackle - Brad Hamilton, Southwest Louisiana
 Defensive tackle - Sid Otton, Weber
 Linebacker - Vern McManus, Lamar Tech
 Linebacker - Wayne Harrington, Montana
 Linebacker - Henry Sorrell, Chattanooga
 Defensive back - Al Mota, Illinois Wesleyan
 Defensive back - Carlos Maiord, McMurry
 Defensive back - Richard Heinen, Northwest Missouri
 Defensive back - George Clayton, Fairmont

See also
 1965 College Football All-America Team

References

Little All-America college football team
Little All-America college football team
Little All-America college football teams